Michael's Harbour is a designated place in the Canadian province of Newfoundland and Labrador. It is just outside Lewisporte. There are no stores or services and residents must commute to Lewisporte for essential services and Campbellton for education until the 9th grade. They commute to Lewisporte for high school. The community had a crisis in 2020 where a house burned down and it was determined that no fire department was obliged to provide services to the community. In February of the same year, the issue was resolved where the Lewisporte Fire Department agreed to provide service in exchange for  fee per homeowner.

Geography 
Michaels Harbour is in Newfoundland within Subdivision G of Division No. 8.

Demographics 

See also 
List of communities in Newfoundland and Labrador
List of designated places in Newfoundland and Labrador

References 

Populated coastal places in Canada
Designated places in Newfoundland and Labrador